Redpath may refer to:

Businesses  

Redpath Motor Vehicle Company, a former Canadian automaker
Redpath Sugar, a Canadian sugar refining company

People  
Redpath (surname), a list of people with the surname Redpath

Places  

Redpath, Scottish Borders, a village in the Scottish Borders, Scotland
Redpath Hall, McGill University's first library building
Redpath Museum, a museum at McGill University
Redpath Sugar Refinery, Toronto, Canada
Redpath Township, Traverse County, Minnesota, United States